The 2007 OFC U-20 Championship was held at the Trusts Stadium in Waitakere City, New Zealand from 19 to 31 January 2007 in a league table format. It was the first tournament in which regular Oceania powerhouse Australia were not participating, following their switch to the Asian Football Confederation (AFC).

Referees

New Zealand
 Michael Hester
 Peter O'Leary

Papua New Guinea
 Minan Ponis
 Salaiau Sosongan

Samoa
 Fiti Aimaasu

Solomon Islands
 Christopher Lengata
 Nelson Sogo

Venues
The tournament will be played at just one venue in Henderson, New Zealand; Trusts Stadium.

Squads

Group stage
Round 1

Round 2

Round 3

Round 4

Round 5

Round 6

Round 7

Final standings

Winners

New Zealand qualified for the 2007 FIFA U-20 World Cup.

Awards

Goalscorers
Roy Krishna received the Golden Boot award for scoring eight goals in the tournament. In total, 81 goals were scored (one of which was an own goal).

8 goals
 Roy Krishna (FIJ)

6 goals
 Chris James (NZL)

4 goals
 Dan Keat (NZL)
 Sam Jenkins (NZL)
 Judd Molea (SOL)

3 goals

 Jeremy Brockie (NZL)
 Richard Sele (NCL)
 Joachim Rande (SOL)
 Joses Nawo (SOL)
 Tony Otini (SOL)
 Leon Chan (TAH)

2 goals

 Michael Cunningham (NZL)
 Alvin Singh (FIJ)
 Eran Underwood (FIJ)
 Jean Christophe Xenie (NCL)
 Ulrich Bowen (NCL)
 Jean Wahnyamalla (NCL)
 Francois Sakama (VAN)
 Ariihau Tereiitau (TAH)

1 goal

 Phil Edginton (NZL)
 Cole Peverley (NZL)
 Krishna Samy (FIJ)
 Esava Naqeleca (FIJ)
 Meneusi Senibuli (FIJ)
 Rinal Prasad (FIJ)
 Cesar Lolohea (NCL)
 Jason Sablan (NCL)
 Dominiko Tokuma (SAM)
 Silao Malo (SAM)
 Ionatana Tino (SAM)
 Tefai Faehau (TAH)
 Teiki Wan Phook (TAH)
 Matahi Hauata (TAH)
 Roihau Degage (TAH)
 Michel Kaltak (VAN)
 Elton Boe (VAN)
 Simon Molbet (VAN)
 Jeffry Nimanian (VAN)
 Brian Melar (VAN)
 Daniel Natou (VAN)

Own goals
  (playing against New Caledonia)

See also
2007 FIFA U-20 World Cup

External links
Event Report
FIFA.com: 2007 OFC U-20 Championship

OFC
OFC U-20 Championship
International association football competitions hosted by New Zealand
Under 20
OFC
2007 in youth association football